In mathematics, a Brjuno number (sometimes spelled Bruno or Bryuno) is a special type of irrational number named for Russian mathematician Alexander Bruno, who introduced them in .

Formal definition

An irrational number  is called a Brjuno number when the infinite sum 

converges to a finite number.

Here:
  is a Brjuno function

Importance
The Brjuno numbers are important in the one–dimensional analytic small divisors problems. Bruno improved the diophantine condition in Siegel's Theorem, showed that germs of holomorphic functions with linear part  are linearizable if  is a Brjuno number.  showed in 1987 that this condition is also necessary, and for quadratic polynomials is necessary and sufficient.

Properties 
Intuitively, these numbers do not have many large "jumps" in the sequence of convergents, in which the denominator of the th convergent is exponentially larger than that of the th convergent. Thus, in contrast to the Liouville numbers, they do not have unusually accurate diophantine approximations by rational numbers.

Brjuno function

Brjuno sum
The Brjuno sum or Brjuno function  is   

where:

Real variant

The real Brjuno function  is defined for irrational numbers  

and satisfies

 

for all irrational  between 0 and 1.

Yoccoz's variant

Yoccoz's variant of the Brjuno sum defined as follows:

 

where:
  is irrational real number: 
  is the fractional part of  
  is the fractional part of  

This sum converges if and only if the Brjuno sum does, and in fact their difference is bounded by a universal constant.

See also
 Transcendental number

References

Notes

Dynamical systems
Number theory